Antonio Ruiz Pérez (born June 17, 1911), nicknamed "Loco", is a Cuban former Negro league pitcher who played in the 1940s.

A native of Havana, Cuba, Ruiz played for the Indianapolis–Cincinnati Clowns in 1944. He went on to play minor league baseball through the 1950s with the El Paso Texans, Tucson Cowboys, Odessa Oilers, and Juarez Indios.

References

External links
 and Baseball-Reference Black Baseball and Mexican League stats and Seamheads

1911 births
Possibly living people
Indianapolis Clowns players